The Mu, also known as M, was a series of Japanese solid-fueled carrier rockets, which were launched from Uchinoura between 1966 and 2006. Originally developed by Japan's Institute of Space and Astronautical Science, Mu rockets were later operated by Japan Aerospace Exploration Agency following ISAS becoming part of it.

Early Japanese carrier rockets
The first Mu rocket, the Mu-1 made a single, sub-orbital, test flight, on 31 October 1966. Subsequently, a series of rockets were produced, designated Mu-3 and Mu-4. In 1969 a suborbital test launch of the Mu-3D was conducted. The first orbital launch attempt for the Mu family, using a Mu-4S, was conducted on 25 September 1970, however the fourth stage did not ignite, and the rocket failed to reach orbit. On 16 February 1971, Tansei 1 was launched by another Mu-4S rocket. Two further Mu-4S launches took place during 1971 and 1972. The Mu-4S was replaced by the Mu-3C, was launched four times between 1974 and 1979, with three successes and one failure, and the Mu-3H, which was launched three times in 1977 and 1978. The Mu-3S was used between 1980 and 1984, making four launches. The final member of the Mu-3 family was the Mu-3SII, which was launched eight times between 1985 and 1995. The Mu-3 was replaced in service by the M-V.

M-V

The M-V, or Mu-5, was introduced in 1997 and retired in 2006. Seven launches, six of which were successful, were conducted. Typically, the M-V flew in a three-stage configuration, however a four-stage configuration, designated M-V KM was used 3 times, with the MUSES-B (HALCA) satellite in 1997, Nozomi (PLANET-B) spacecraft in 1998, and the Hayabusa (MUSES-C) spacecraft in 2003. The M-V KM could launch  to an orbit with 30° inclination and  altitude.

List of launches 
All launches are from the Mu Launch Pad at the Uchinoura Space Center.

Two sub-orbital launches of the Mu family were performed prior to its first orbital flight: the 1.5 stage Mu-1 flew on October 31, 1966, at 05:04 UTC and the 3.5 stage Mu-3D flew on August 17, 1969, at 06:00 UTC.

See also
 Epsilon (rocket)
 J-I
 Comparison of orbital launchers families
 Comparison of orbital launch systems

References

External links

Mu series in Encyclopedia Astronautica
ISAS Satellite Launch Vehicles

Solid-fuel rockets
Space launch vehicles of Japan
Rocket families
Japanese inventions